Crystal Nights ( Krystallines nychtes) is a 1992 Greek drama film directed by Tonia Marketaki. It was screened in the Un Certain Regard section at the 1992 Cannes Film Festival.

Cast
 François Delaive as Albert
 Michele Valley as Isabella
 Tania Tripi as Anna
 Katerina Baka
 Spiros Bibilas
 Yorgos Charalabidis
 Kelly Ioakeimidou
 Kelly Karmiri
 Faidon Kastris
 Dimitris Katsimanis
 Alexandros Koliopoulos
 Frosso Litra
 Giorgos Mihailidis
 Ovidiu Iuliu Moldovan
 Tassos Palatzidis
 Manos Vakousis
 Melina Vamvaka
 Manos Pantelidis as The Snitch (uncredited)

References

External links

1992 films
Greek drama films
1990s Greek-language films
1992 drama films
Films directed by Tonia Marketaki
Greek horror films